Westbound Stage is a 1939 American Western film directed by Spencer Gordon Bennet and written by Robert Emmett Tansey. The film stars Tex Ritter, Nelson McDowell, Muriel Evans, Nolan Willis, Steve Clark and Tom London. The film was released on December 15, 1939, by Monogram Pictures.

Plot

Cast          
Tex Ritter as Tex Wallace
Nelson McDowell as Sandy
Muriel Evans as Joan Hale
Nolan Willis as Bart Lane
Steve Clark as Butch
Tom London as Parker 
Reed Howes as Red Greer
Frank Ellis as Spider
Chick Hannan as Clip 
Kenne Duncan as Capt. Jim Wallace 
Frank LaRue as Colonel Hale
Phil Dunham as Jefferson Wells 
Hank Bell as Tim 
Chester Gan as Charlie
Edward Cecil as Jim Blake 
Vance Rush as Sgt. Toby
Wally West as Orderly

References

External links
 

1939 films
1930s English-language films
American Western (genre) films
1939 Western (genre) films
Monogram Pictures films
Films directed by Spencer Gordon Bennet
American black-and-white films
1930s American films